In Greek mythology, Antigonus (Ancient Greek: Ἀντίγονος means 'comparable to his father, worthy of his father') was one of the suitors of Penelope who came from Dulichium along with other 56 wooers. He, with the other suitors, was killed by Odysseus with the help of Eumaeus, Philoetius, and Telemachus.

Notes

Reference 

 Apollodorus, The Library with an English Translation by Sir James George Frazer, F.B.A., F.R.S. in 2 Volumes, Cambridge, MA, Harvard University Press; London, William Heinemann Ltd. 1921. ISBN 0-674-99135-4. Online version at the Perseus Digital Library. Greek text available from the same website.

Suitors of Penelope